The 1952–53 Eintracht Frankfurt season was the 53rd season in the club's football history. In 1952–53 the club played in the Oberliga Süd, the top tier of German football. It was the club's 8th season in the Oberliga Süd.

The season ended up with Eintracht winning Oberliga Süd for the first time, later losing to Holstein Kiel in the quarter final in the run for the German championship knockout stage.

Matches

Legend

Friendlies

Oberliga

League fixtures and results

League table

Championship round

DFB-Pokal / SFV-Pokal

Squad

Squad and statistics

|}

Transfers

In:

Out:

See also
 1953 German football championship

Notes

Sources

External links
 Official English Eintracht website 
 German archive site
 1952–53 Oberliga Süd season at Fussballdaten.de 

1952-53
German football clubs 1952–53 season